Flesh and Bone is a 1993 American neo noir mystery thriller film written and directed by Steve Kloves that stars Meg Ryan, Dennis Quaid and James Caan. Gwyneth Paltrow is featured in an early role, for which she received some praise.

Plot

A family in rural Texas finds a boy, Arlis, who says he is lost. They take him into their home, feed him, and give a place to sleep. But the boy later lets his father, Roy (James Caan), into the house to commit a robbery. When they are discovered, Roy brutally murders the family, which the boy witnesses. The sole survivor is a baby girl.

Time passes, and Arlis (Dennis Quaid) lives a solitary life in which he drives a truckload of goods and novelties to restock vending machines and arcade games in roadside stores and restaurants. Making a stop at a roadhouse where a rowdy party is being held, he spots Kay (Meg Ryan), a woman who pops up out of a cake at the party and then passes out because she's been drinking liquor.

Arlis ends up giving her a ride home, a long drive, while continuing to make his rounds. Upon coming home, Kay sees that her husband Reese has sold the furniture, having lost their money gambling. She packs up her remaining belongings and leaves with Arlis. They spend more time together and grow close.

Meanwhile, a young woman named Ginnie (Gwyneth Paltrow) now travels with a much older Roy. She is a grifter who will pretend to be a mourner in order to steal the jewelry from a dead body at a funeral home. Ginnie brings an injured Roy to his estranged son, Arlis, to tend to his injury.

Passing the house where he grew up, Arlis realizes that Kay was the infant who survived the long-ago murders. Roy figures this out as well. He begins talking about tying up loose ends. It leads to a confrontation, and Arlis shoots Roy dead. Ginnie goes off on her own, and Kay and Arlis go their separate ways.

Cast
 Dennis Quaid as Arlis Sweeney
 Meg Ryan as Kay Davies
 James Caan as Roy Sweeney
 Gwyneth Paltrow as Ginnie
 Scott Wilson as Elliott
 Gail Cronauer as Emma
 John Hawkes as Groom

Location
Principal photography began on October 5, 1992 and completed on December 26, 1992.

It was filmed in Lockhart and Marfa, Texas, as well as at the Mustang Mott store owned by Maxine McCoy, in Westhoff, Texas.

Producer Mark Rosenberg died of a heart attack suffered on the film's location in Stanton, Texas.
As the end credits begin, the film is dedicated to him.

Reception
On Rotten Tomatoes, Flesh and Bone holds a 65% approval rating from 26 reviews, with an average rating of 6/10. On Metacritic, the film has a score of 57 out of 100 based on 21 reviews, indicating "mixed or average reviews". Audiences polled by CinemaScore gave the film an average grade of "C" on an A+ to F scale.

References

External links
 
 
 
 
 

1993 films
1993 drama films
1990s English-language films
American drama films
American neo-noir films
Films about con artists
Films directed by Steve Kloves
Films scored by Thomas Newman
Films set in Texas
Films shot in Texas
Films with screenplays by Steve Kloves
Paramount Pictures films
Southern Gothic films
1990s American films